A plumber wrench (or plumber's wrench, pipe wrench, Swedish wrench or Swedish pattern wrench) is a form of plier described as a pipe wrench that uses compound leverage to grip and rotate plumbing pipes. Similar to the action of a Vise Grip plier, its jaw opening is adjusted to width by rotating a threaded ring.  Its advantage is that it grips with significant force without needing to engage a lock nut like an adjustable tongue-and-groove plier.  Like these, it can also be used on nuts, particularly hex shaped, and other flat engagement points. If used carelessly it can dent or break plumbing pipe.

History
The plumber wrench was invented in 1888 by the Swedish inventor named Johan Petter Johansson.  It shares some principles with both the Stillson-pattern pipe wrench and the rigid pipe wrench, as well as various forms of adjustable pliers, such as the Vise Grip and "Channelock" tongue-and-groove plier.  

Johansson's tool is used rather than a pair of tongs to separate or join
 pipes. It is not widely known in North America, but is common in Europe.

Johansson also improved the adjustable wrench, with a patent in 1891.

See also
Monkey wrench
Pipe wrench
Tongue-and-groove pliers

References

Plumbing
Wrenches
Swedish inventions